Scissors dance may refer to:

Danza de tijeras, Peru
Sher (dance), an East European Jewish dance